Jaguar Racing is the name given to Jaguar Land Rover's racing interests. It currently competes in Formula E under the name Jaguar TCS Racing as a result of the partnership with Tata Consultancy Services. It was previously a Formula One constructor that competed in the FIA Formula One World Championship from 2000 to 2004. In addition to single seaters, the Jaguar brand also has rich history in various forms of sportscar racing, most notably with the XJR sportscars that enjoyed high success in the FIA World Sportscar Championship and also the IMSA GT Championship during the late 1980s and early 1990s.

Formula One

Jaguar Racing was formed from the purchase by Ford of Jackie Stewart's Stewart Grand Prix Formula One team in June 1999. On 14 September 1999, Ford renamed the team as part of its global marketing operations to promote their Jaguar premium car company. Despite this branding, they continued to use full-works Ford Cosworth engines in the cars, no Jaguar engineering was involved and also served as Ford's official Formula One full-works team. Drivers included Eddie Irvine from 2000 to 2002, Johnny Herbert in 2000, Luciano Burti for a few races in 2001 and the Austrian Grand Prix in 2000, Pedro de la Rosa in 2001 and 2002, Antônio Pizzonia in 2003 until Hockenheim, Mark Webber in 2003 and 2004, Justin Wilson from Hockenheim to the end of 2003, and Christian Klien in 2004.

2000 season
The team in 2000 was managed by Wolfgang Reitzle, who was then head of Ford's Premier Automotive Group. The extra funding and publicity brought by becoming Ford's own team were obvious from the first race of the year. The team hired 1999 world championship runner up Eddie Irvine to partner former Stewart driver Johnny Herbert, but the results that season did not match the results that Stewart had been able to achieve in 1999. Jaguar would finish ninth in the Constructors' Championship, only ahead of Minardi and Prost who both failed to score any points.

2001 season

Reitzle stepped down and was replaced by American racing champion and successful team owner Bobby Rahal for 2001. Results did not improve, and the appointment of three-time F1 World Champion Niki Lauda in the middle of the year did not help team morale, with the team sliding further back in the field.  An abortive attempt to bring McLaren's ex-technical director Adrian Newey to Jaguar further destabilised the team, and conflict between Rahal and Lauda led to Rahal's resignation. The highlight of the season, however, was Irvine scoring the team's first podium in Monaco, finishing third. This allowed Jaguar to finish eighth in the Constructors' Championship.

2002 season

2002 was even worse under Lauda's stewardship, with only a resurgence later in the year in terms of results.  Ford's board of directors were beginning to have major issues with the costs and benefits of running the team in Formula One, especially as it did not feature the parent company brand. Irvine scored another third-place finish, this time at Monza, which would ultimately be Jaguar's last podium in the sport. Jaguar would once again improve their result in the Constructors' Championship, this time finishing seventh.

2003 season
Funding was reduced for 2003. Lauda and 70 other staff were made redundant, and a 2-year timeframe was given to show possible benefits. 2003 saw an improvement of form for the team, directed by John Hogan, as it benefited from good management and a more efficient usage of resources (in particular, using a wind tunnel near the factory compared to one in California). A new lineup consisting of Mark Webber and Antônio Pizzonia (who was later replaced by Justin Wilson) would lead the team to seventh place in the Constructors' Championship.

2004 season

In Jaguar's final season, the team received publicity when two of the team's mechanics, having won an inflatable donkey from the movie Shrek from a give-away on a fizzy drink can, photographed it around the paddock at several races and set up a website for the pictures. After the 2004 Brazilian Grand Prix, Bernie Ecclestone, Max Mosley, much of the sport's management, and every driver except Michael Schumacher signed the donkey, and the mechanics announced their intention to auction it on eBay and donate the proceeds to charity. For the 2004 Monaco Grand Prix, Jaguar's cars were fitted with newly designed nose cones to promote the film Ocean's Twelve. Steinmetz Group diamonds worth in excess of US$250,000 were attached to the nose of each car, one of which allegedly went missing after Christian Klien's first lap crash. 2004 saw a stabilisation of results, but the team was unable to challenge for points on a consistent basis. Jaguar would finish seventh in the Constructors' Championship, for the third year in a row.

Jaguar's Formula One parent company, Ford, issued a polite ultimatum as part of a reduction in sport involvement internationally. In particular, because Jaguar did not advertise the core Ford brand, there was little return of value from the enormous amount of money invested, so funding was reduced from Ford itself. Ford chose to sell the operation near the end of 2004 despite a more consistent showing in its previous two years as Ford wanted to concentrate on World Rally Championship operations on the international motorsports sector and thus Ford forced to absent from international automobile road racing for 11 years until its return in 2016 but Ford partnered Chip Ganassi Racing GTE Pro team as their full-works partnership team in FIA World Endurance Championship. In mid-November 2004, energy drink company Red Bull confirmed that they had purchased the Jaguar Formula One team from Ford as an ongoing outfit. The new team, named Red Bull Racing, used the chassis and engine that would have been Jaguar's 2005 Formula 1 challenger for its first season.

Formula E
Rumours of a possible Jaguar Formula E entry go back to the summer of 2015. Jaguar's intentions to enter Formula E were officially revealed in December of that year. Unlike its Formula One campaign, the team was to enter the series as a manufacturer, developing its own powertrain. Jaguar made their debut in Formula E's third season, replacing the folded Trulli GP.

2016–17 season

On 19 August 2016, it was announced that Jaguar would bring A1 GP champion Adam Carroll, Le Mans champion Harry Tincknell and 2012 and 2014 GP3 champions Mitch Evans and Alex Lynn to the pre-season test at Donington Park, with plans for a team launch on 8 September 2016. Carroll and Evans were subsequently signed to the team and Panasonic was named as the team's main sponsor. Lear Corporation, who used to support Jaguar in their Formula One campaign, were announced as the secondary sponsor. In October 2016, Gorillaz guitarist Noodle became Jaguar's global ambassador, following a commercial that shows her driving in an electric open-wheeled car, before getting out and saying the experience could be improved.

For the 2016–17 season, Jaguar would finish 10th in Teams' Championship, with the best result being a double points finish of 4th and 8th at the 2017 Mexico City ePrix. Carroll along with Andretti's Robin Frijns were the only two drivers to finish all 12 races of the season.

2017–18 season

Prior to the season, Jaguar entered a multi-year partnership with GKN. A new sponsorship deal with Viessmann was also announced. In an effort to boost its chances at good results, Jaguar signed Nelson Piquet Jr., the series' inaugural Drivers' Champion. Piquet had the option to stay with his previous employer NIO, but chose not to as a performance clause allowed him to exit the team. Evans was retained to partner Piquet, who replaced Carroll. Ho-Pin Tung remained with the team for another season as a reserve driver. At the season's first event in Hong Kong, Jaguar scored points in both of the weekend's races and took their first podium in the series when Mitch Evans was moved up to third following a post race disqualification of Daniel Abt. The team used Paul di Resta and Pietro Fittipaldi for a rookie test held in Marrakesh which followed the 2018 Marrakesh ePrix. At the Zürich ePrix, Evans claimed the team's maiden pole position.

Jaguar would finish 6th in Teams' Championship, with the best result being Evans' inherited third place in the second race of the 2017 Hong Kong ePrix. The team managed three double points finishes throughout the season. Both drivers finished in top 10 of the Drivers' Championship – Evans was seventh, while Piquet ended the season at ninth place. Piquet, however, also had the most retirements out of all drivers who competed in the season – he missed the chequered flag five times.

2018–19 season

Evans and Piquet were retained for the 2018–19 season. Ho-Pin Tung was also retained in his position. In addition to his reserve driver duty, Tung also served as a pundit and was part of the Jaguar I-Pace eTrophy broadcast team. For the 2019 rookie test (which was once again held in Marrakesh following the ePrix), the team opted to bring back Pietro Fittipaldi and pair him with Harry Tincknell. In March 2019, just after the inaugural Sanya ePrix, Piquet left the team following a string of poor results (in contrast to Evans' string of points finishes) and was replaced by former Virgin driver Alex Lynn. Evans managed to win the following race in Rome, giving Jaguar their first win – this was also the team's first actual podium finish in the series. His teammate Lynn finished 12th on his Jaguar debut. Evans' car was subsequently sent to the FIA headquarters in Geneva for checks to analyse one of the wishbones and its compliance with the wishbone/arm element sealed at the homologation. No issues were found, thus the win became officially confirmed.

Evans' point-scoring streak came to an end in a rain-soaked Paris ePrix, where he was the last driver to physically cross the finish line in sixteenth place, being a lap down after an unscheduled pit stop for a new nose. Lynn was forced to retire from a promising eleventh place after an accident with Venturi's Edoardo Mortara, effectively ending Jaguar's chances to score points in this round. As a result, this was the first race of the season where both cars failed to score points. The following race in Monaco was a success, with both cars finishing on points for the first time since the opening round in Ad Diriyah. The race also marked Lynn's first point-scoring finish for the team. The team had a strong finish to the season, with Evans picking up multiple podium finishes, which even inserted him into Drivers' Championship fight at the Swiss ePrix, after which he found himself third in the ongoing championship with 87 points. Lynn was mostly dealing with reliability issues, most notably retiring from second place in the first New York City race at the Brooklyn Street Circuit.

Despite improved form in the second half of the season, Jaguar would finish 7th in Teams' Championship with 116 points, which is down from a 6th place achieved in the previous season. Evans, however, improved his result in Drivers' Championship as he finished fifth with 105 points, only three points short from Lucas di Grassi, who finished third. Evans was also the only driver who managed to physically cross the finish line in every race of the season, even though Audi's Daniel Abt was classified in every race as well (but failed to finish in Rome as he retired in the final lap).

2019–20 season

In June 2019, Jaguar began their season six development testings with Alex Lynn and Mitch Evans. The team also tested James Calado, a potential candidate for the second seat. On 26 September, Jaguar formally confirmed Evans as their first driver as he signed a multi-year contract with the team. This will be Evans' fourth consecutive season with Jaguar. On 2 October, Calado was confirmed as Evans' teammate. On the same day, Jaguar also unveiled the new I-Type 4 along with Castrol as its new partner, which returns to Jaguar's motorsport activities after a near 30-year absence. On 7 January 2020, it was announced that Alex Lynn was brought back to the team to become a reserve and test driver. With this move, Ho-Pin Tung, Jaguar's previous reserve driver, became the Jaguar Racing Global Ambassador while also remaining in the I-Pace eTrophy commentary team.

At the Mexico City ePrix, Evans gave Jaguar their second Formula E win while also picking up a second consecutive bonus point for being the fastest driver in group qualifying stage. Calado finished ninth, but was later disqualified for a technical infringement. On 19 February, Jaguar announced Jamie Chadwick as the first of the two selected drivers for the third annual Marrakesh rookie test. On the following day, Sacha Fenestraz was announced to join Chadwick for the rookie test. On 30 July, Jaguar announced Tom Blomqvist as its new reserve driver, after Lynn got signed to Mahindra Racing and leaving Jaguar in the process. Calado's final race for Jaguar would be the fourth Berlin race as 2020 6 Hours of Spa-Francorchamps prevented him from attending the final two races, in which the new reserve Blomqvist would take his place.

After an unsuccessful season finale in Berlin, Jaguar would only score 81 points in their campaign, finishing 7th in Teams' Championship once again.

2020–21 season
On 14 July 2020, Jaguar became the first team to announce its driver lineup for the 2020–21 season after signing Sam Bird to the team. Bird would finish the ongoing 2019–20 season with Envision Virgin Racing before completing the switch. Evans continues with the team as he signed a multi-year contract prior to the 2019–20 season. In October 2020, Jaguar unveiled the development version of the I-Type 5 car, with the team only referencing to itself as Jaguar Racing, quietly splitting with the title sponsor Panasonic. On 27 November, the team held a virtual launch of the I-Type 5 along with the drivers presentation, revealing new sponsors and announcing the car numbers. In February 2021, Sacha Fenestraz returned to the team as a reserve driver, replacing Blomqvist who joined NIO 333 as a full-time driver.

The Diriyah ePrix double-header saw the team scoring two podium finishes and two retirements. In the first race, Evans finished third after successfully defending his position over René Rast. Bird retired from the race following a collision with Alex Lynn, who was later given a penalty for the incident. In the following race, Bird won his first race in the Jaguar overalls after starting from third and successfully overtaking Dragon's Sérgio Sette Câmara at the start and later the pole-sitter Robin Frijns, his former Virgin Racing teammate. The race however ended prematurely red-flagged due to Alex Lynn being involved in a huge collision with Evans, who retired in the process. He tried to check on Lynn, who was later taken to hospital. After this race, Jaguar moved to the lead in Teams' Championship for the very first time. At the Valencia ePrix double-header, the team lost its lead in Teams' Championship as it failed to score a single point after poor qualifying performances in both races due to wet conditions in their qualifying group.

In May 2021, Tom Dillmann joined the team as a second reserve driver, returning to the sport after previously competing for Venturi and NIO. On 22 July 2021, Jaguar Land Rover formally committed to Formula E for the next set of rules which are set to keep Jaguar Racing on the grid until 2026. Then on 3 August, it was announced that Evans signed another multi-year extension with the team. Before the Berlin ePrix, it was announced that Gerd Mäuser would step down from his role as a chairman after the season with Thierry Bolloré succeeding him in the role. In their most successful season to date, Jaguar Racing finished second in Teams' Championship with 177 points, having led it on two separate occasions (the second one being before the final round), with two victories scored by Bird and further six podium finishes, five of which scored by Evans who as a result scored the most podium finishes out of anyone that season.

2021–22 season
On 2 November 2021, the team announced their latest rebranding to Jaguar TCS Racing along with confirming the unchanged driver lineup of Bird and Evans. Thierry Bolloré was also confirmed as the team's new chairman. On 17 January 2022, Norman Nato was announced as Jaguar's new reserve and simulator driver, joining Tom Dillmann and replacing Sacha Fenestraz. On 8 February 2022, it was announced that Jaguar would become powertrain suppliers for Envision Racing over the duration of the Gen3 era of Formula E which is set to start with the 2022–23 season.

After a poor start to the season, Jaguar recovered at the Rome ePrix where Evans got a double victory. Bird was also looking for a double points finish, but he was forced to retire from the second race. At the inaugural Jakarta ePrix, Evans added another win to his resume, remaining fourth in the championship, but getting closer to his title rivals that gained advantage on him after a less successful Berlin ePrix double-header.

Sponsors

Sports car racing

XJR sportscars

The Jaguar XJR sportscars were a series of sports prototypes that competed in the World Sportscar Championship and IMSA GT Championship between 1984 and 1993. These cars enjoyed high success, with some of the highlights being:

 Silk Cut Jaguar winning the 1987 World Sportscar Championship with the XJR-8;
 Silk Cut Jaguar winning the 1988 World Sportscar Championship, including the 24 Hours of Le Mans, with the XJR-9;
 Castrol Jaguar winning the 1988 24 Hours of Daytona with the XJR-9;
 Silk Cut Jaguar winning the 1990 24 Hours of Le Mans with the XJR-12;
 Castrol Jaguar winning the 1990 24 Hours of Daytona with the XJR-12;
 Silk Cut Jaguar winning the 1991 World Sportscar Championship with the XJR-14 and XJR-12;
 Justin Law winning the 2008 and 2010 editions of Le Mans Legend with the XJR-12 and XJR-9 respectively.

GT2

In 2009, RSR Racing revealed the new Jaguar XKR GT2 car, which the team was to enter the American Le Mans Series' GT2 class with.

RSR first raced the XKR in the 2010 American Le Mans Series with Paul Gentilozzi, Ryan Dalziel and Marc Goossens. They finished last in the GT class with five points. They also visited that year's 24 Hours of Le Mans, but retired early into the race. The team then entered another season in the American Le Mans Series with Cristiano da Matta and Bruno Junqueira, this time finishing ninth (second last) with six points.

GT3
The first GT3 iteration of the XKR was developed by Apex Motorsport, which ran these cars in the FIA GT3 European Championship (from 2007 to 2009).

Jaguar then had a fairly long run in the Blancpain GT Series, with the Switzerland-based racing outfit Emil Frey Racing fielding multiple Jaguar XK Emil Frey G3 cars. Those were an in-house development by Emil Frey Racing, with approval from Jaguar, that conformed to full FIA GT3 regulations. The car debuted in the 2012 Blancpain Endurance Series and finished its run in the 2018 Blancpain GT Series Endurance Cup. For its farewell season, the car was moved to the Silver Cup and won the championship with the lineup of Alex Fontana, Mikaël Grenier and Adrian Zaugg. It was also third overall in the Endurance Cup Team Rankings. In the previous seasons, the XKRs were run exclusively in the Pro Cup, with the team fielding two cars instead of one in the 2016 and 2017 seasons.

GT4

A new entry to the British GT Championship, named Invictus Games Racing and financed by James Holder, fielded two new Jaguar cars for the 2018 season. Despite conforming to standard GT4 regulations, the Jaguar F-Type SVR GT4 was run exclusively in British GT and was not expected to be made available to other customers. The GT4 iteration was developed by Jaguar Land Rover's SVO division.

Invictus ran two cars in the 2018 season, both in Pro-Am class. Jason Wolfe and Matthew George were the full-time professional drivers of these cars, while Steve McCulley, Paul Vice, Ben Norfolk and Basil Rawlinson have been selected as the amateur drivers. The entry was reduced to a single car for the 2019 season, with George, McCulley and Vice staying in the team.

The Invictus team disbanded prior to the 2020 season. In February 2020, both cars along with spare parts were auctioned via Silverstone Auctions and eventually sold for £213,750.

I-Pace eTrophy

For the 2018–19 season, Jaguar Racing launched a support series for Formula E, dubbed the Jaguar I-PACE eTROPHY. The series operated an 'Arrive and Drive' package for up to 20 drivers at each race, including a different VIP driver at every venue. The series would be cancelled after the 2019–20 season due to the COVID-19 pandemic.

Complete Formula One results

As an engine supplier
(key) (results in bold indicate pole position; results in italics indicate fastest lap)

As a constructor
(key) (results in bold indicate pole position; results in italics indicate fastest lap)

Notes
 – Driver did not finish the Grand Prix, but was classified as he completed over 90% of the race distance.

Complete Formula E results
(key) (results in bold indicate pole position; results in italics indicate fastest lap)

Notes
  – Driver was fastest in group qualifying stage and was given one championship point.
  – Driver secured pole position and was given three championship points
 † – Driver did not finish the race, but was classified as he completed over 90% of the race distance.
 * – Season still in progress.

Other teams supplied by Jaguar

See also

 Jaguar Cars

Footnotes

References

External links

 
 Jaguar Racing Official US website
 Jaguar Racing Official MENA website
 Jaguar Racing DNA

Jaguar in motorsport
2016 establishments in the United Kingdom
Auto racing teams established in 2014
British auto racing teams
British racecar constructors
 
Formula One entrants
Formula E teams
British Formula Three teams
24 Hours of Le Mans teams
World Sportscar Championship teams